Holy Trinity Church is a redundant Anglican parish church in New Church Lane, Ulverston, Cumbria, England.  It is recorded in the National Heritage List for England as a designated Grade II listed building.  It is a Commissioners' church, having received a grant towards its construction from the Church Building Commission.

History

Holy Trinity was built between 1829 and 1832, and was designed by Anthony Salvin.  A grant of £3,423 (equivalent to £ as of ) was given towards its construction by the Church Building Commission, the total cost of construction being £4,978.  The interior of the church was re-ordered, and the chancel was added, by the Lancaster architects Paley and Austin in 1880.  The church was declared redundant on 1 October 1976, converted for use as a sports hall the following year, and further converted, this time for residential use, in 1996.

Architecture

Exterior
The church is constructed in limestone rubble with sandstone dressings, and has slate roofs.  Its plan consists of a five-bay nave, north and south aisles, a chancel at a lower level, and a northwest tower with a spire.  The tower has angle buttresses, pairs of lancet bell openings over which is a band of trefoils, and pinnacles at the corners.  The aisle bays are separated by buttresses.  The walls contain lancet windows, with doorways in the western bay on the south side, and in the fourth bay from the west on the north side.  At the west end of the church is a doorway, above which is a triple stepped lancet window.  There is another triple stepped lancet at the east end of the chancel, and windows with trefoil heads in its north and south walls.

Interior
Inside the church the five-bay arcades are carried on octagonal piers.  In the chancel is a double sedilia and a piscina.  The reredos is in marble and alabaster.  In the north aisle are two windows containing stained glass, one by Morris, and the other, dating from about 1905, by Kempe.  When the church was examined for listing in the mid-1990s, it was disused, its interior had been subdivided, and false ceilings had been inserted.  The original three-manual organ had been built by Bellamy of Manchester.  It was updated in 1853 by Jardine and company, also of Manchester, and rebuilt in 1958 by Rushworth and Dreaper.

See also

List of Commissioners' churches in Northeast and Northwest England
Listed buildings in Ulverston
List of new churches by Anthony Salvin
List of ecclesiastical works by Paley and Austin

References

External links
Visit Cumbria

Church of England church buildings in Cumbria
Grade II listed churches in Cumbria
19th-century Church of England church buildings
Gothic Revival church buildings in England
Gothic Revival architecture in Cumbria
Commissioners' church buildings
Former Church of England church buildings
Ulverston